Khongor (soft or sweetheart) is a sum (district) of Darkhan-Uul Province in northern Mongolia. The sum center has railway station on the Ulan-Ude - Ulan Bator - Beijing line. The most important railway station is 13 km south of the sum center, where at Salkhit settlement Salkhit - Erdenet line starts.

In 2007, Khongor was the scene of an apparently massive contamination case that involved sodium cyanide and mercury compounds, materials used for small-scale gold mining. The case aroused considerable attention in the national media, and it was even discussed to relocate the settlement.

References

Populated places in Mongolia
Districts of Darkhan-Uul Province